Imperato is a surname. Notable people by that name include:

 N. Imperato, stamp forger based in Genoa, Italy in the early 1920s.
 Ferrante Imperato (c.1525–1615), apothecary of Naples.
 Pascal James Imperato (born 1937), doctor and professor of tropical medicine and public health.
 Tommaso Imperato (1596–1656), Roman Catholic prelate.